Xin Zhang is a professor of mechanical engineering, electrical & computer engineering, biomedical engineering, materials science & engineering, and the Photonics Center at Boston University (BU).

Education 
Zhang received her Ph.D. from the Hong Kong University of Science and Technology (HKUST) in mechanical engineering. She was a postdoctoral researcher and then a research scientist with the Massachusetts Institute of Technology (MIT).

Career 
Zhang joined the faculty of Boston University in 2002, and became Inaugural Distinguished Faculty Fellow of Engineering in 2009, and Distinguished Professor of Engineering in 2022.

Research 
Zhang leads the Laboratory for Microsystems Technology (LMST) at Boston University that focuses on the broad areas of metamaterials and microelectromechanical systems (MEMS or microsystems).

Professional Memberships 
 Fellow of the American Society of Mechanical Engineers (ASME), 2015
 Fellow of the Optica (formerly known as The Optical Society (OSA)), 2016
 Fellow of the American Institute for Medical and Biological Engineering (AIMBE), 2016
 Associate Fellow of the American Institute of Aeronautics and Astronautics (AIAA), 2017
 Fellow of the American Association for the Advancement of Science (AAAS), 2016
 Fellow of the Institute of Electrical and Electronics Engineers (IEEE), 2017
 Fellow of the American Physical Society (APS), 2019
 Fellow of the National Academy of Inventors (NAI), 2019

Honors, Awards and Special Recognitions 
 Inaugural Distinguished Faculty Fellow (2009) -- An honor given to engineering faculty at Boston University "who is on a clear trajectory toward exemplary leadership career in all dimensions of science and engineering".
 IEEE Sensors Council Technical Achievement Award (2016) -- An advanced career award that "honors a person with outstanding technical contributions, as documented by publications and patents".
 Charles DeLisi Award and Distinguished Lecture (2018) -- An honor recognizing faculty at Boston University "who has made outstanding contributions to engineering and society".
 Innovator of the Year Award (2018) -- Bestowed annually by Boston University on a faculty member who "translates his/her world-class research into inventions and innovations that benefit humankind".
 IET Innovation Award on Emerging Technology Design (2019) -- "The awards celebrate the most pioneering engineering and technology innovations from energy and sustainability to transport and healthcare".
 Fellow of National Academy of Inventors (2019) -- For "creating or facilitating outstanding inventions that have made a tangible impact on quality of life, economic development, and the welfare of society".
 Finalist of IET Achievement Medals (2020) -- For "major and distinguished contributions in the various sectors of engineering and technology".
 Invented Here! Honoree (2020 & 2021) -- Chosen by Boston Patent Law Association (BPLA) for the patent "Apparatus for improving magnetic resonance imaging" in 2020 and the patent "Air-transparent selective sound silencer using ultra-open metamaterial" in 2021.
 Finalist of E&T Innovation Awards (2020 & 2021) -- Excellence in R&D in 2020, Digital Health and Social Care in 2021, and TechforGood in 2021. The awards "recognise and celebrate the very best new innovations across the breadth of science, engineering and technology".
 Rajen Kilachand Fund for Integrated Life Science and Engineering (2021) -- To "support interdisciplinary research and solutions to some of today's most vexing societal woes and medical diseases".
 Distinguished Professor of Engineering (2022) -- "who have had a lengthy, distinguished record of impact in research and service to their profession. The title will be retained throughout their career at Boston University".
 Guggenheim Fellow (2022) -- by the John Simon Guggenheim Memorial Foundation to those "who have demonstrated exceptional capacity for productive scholarship or exceptional creative ability in the arts".

Recently, Zhang's research on metamaterials technologies, both those that enable highly efficient, air-permeable sound silencing and noise reduction and those that markedly boosts MRI signal-to-noise ratio and thus significantly improves the performance of MRI, have drawn significant worldwide interest from the scientific community and industry, with the stories having been picked up by 300+ media outlets.

Education and Outreach 
Zhang is Director of both the National Science Foundation (NSF) Research Experiences for Undergraduates (REU) Site and Research Experiences for Teachers (RET) Site in Integrated Nanomanufacturing at Boston University. She also serves as Associate Director of the Boston University Nanotechnology Innovation Center. Among the graduate students and postdoctoral fellows from her lab, several have received tenure-track faculty positions at major research universities, and the rest are established in national labs, major centers and hospitals, and large companies and startups.

References

Year of birth missing (living people)
Living people
21st-century American engineers
Boston University faculty
Alumni of the Hong Kong University of Science and Technology
Massachusetts Institute of Technology people
Fellows of the American Association for the Advancement of Science
Fellows of the American Institute for Medical and Biological Engineering
Fellows of the American Physical Society
Fellows of the American Society of Mechanical Engineers
Fellow Members of the IEEE
Fellows of Optica (society)
Institution of Engineering and Technology